Warren Lee (born 21 May 1958) is an Australian businessman and former Australian rules footballer who played with Hawthorn in the Victorian Football League (VFL).

Football career 
Recruited from Collegians, Lee broke into the strong Hawthorn side early in the 1978 VFL season. After six senior games a knee injury put an end to his VFL career.

Business career 
After completing a Commerce degree at the University of Melbourne Lee embarked on a career in the Financial Services sector.

He has held the following senior roles:
 Chief Executive Officer - Victorian Funds Management Corporation (from October 2012)
 Chief Executive Officer - AXA Australia and New Zealand
 Chief Financial Officer - AXA Australia and New Zealand
 Chief Financial Officer - AXA China Region Insurance Company Limited
 Chief Operating Officer - AXA Hong Kong
 Independent Director - Tower Limited (NZ)

Notes

External links 

Living people
1958 births
Australian rules footballers from Melbourne
Hawthorn Football Club players
Collegians Football Club players
University of Melbourne alumni
People from Glen Iris, Victoria
20th-century Australian businesspeople
Australian bankers
Businesspeople from Melbourne